Milk rice may refer to:

Food  
 Kiribath, a traditional dish made from rice in Sri Lankan cuisine
 No htamin, a festive rice dish in Burmese cuisine

See also
 Coconut rice, a dish prepared by soaking white rice in coconut milk or cooking it with coconut flakes
 Rice pudding, a dish made from rice mixed with water or milk
 Rice milk, a plant milk made from rice